Balutak is a village in Fars Province, Iran.

Balutak may also refer to:
 Balutak-e Sheykhan, Khuzestan Province

See also
Chal-e Balutak